Until We Meet is the 7th studio album by Claire Kuo. It was released on 26 June 2014 by Linfair Records.

Track listing

References

Claire Kuo albums
2013 albums